Dehlia Victoria Umunna is a Clinical Professor of Law and Deputy Director of the Criminal Justice Institute (CJI) at Harvard Law School. Professor Umunna is a nationally renowned expert on criminal law, criminal defense and theory, mass incarceration, and race issues.

Early life 
Umunna was born in London, England, in 1973 to a Nigerian father and a Sierra Leonean mother, and she grew up in Nigeria. She has two brothers.

Education 
Umunna received her BA in Communications from The California State University, San Bernardino, in 1995. She received her JD from George Washington University Law School in 1998, where she was awarded the J.B. Shapiro Prize for Public Interest, and her Master's in Public Administration from the Harvard Kennedy School in 2011.

Career 
After graduating from law school, Umunna joined the Public Defender Service for the District of Columbia, where she represented hundreds of indigent juveniles and adults. In 2002, she became a Practitioner in Residence at American University's Washington College of Law, where she taught and supervised students in the Civil Clinic. Umunna joined Harvard Law School staff in 2007 as a Clinical Instructor at HLS's Criminal Justice Institute (CJI). She was promoted to CJI Deputy Director by then-Dean Martha Minow in 2013. Most recently, Umunna was appointed Clinical Professor of Law at HLS in 2015. She now enjoys teaching, mentoring, and advising students, having been selected by the Harvard Law School Class of 2020 to deliver the first of four speeches in the Law School's "Last Lecture" series. Professor Umunna has been featured in several media outlets, including Criminal podcast, Black Enterprise, and Special Report Network with Areva Martin.

Published Articles 
Umunna's article "Rethinking the Neighborhood Watch: How Lessons from Nigerian Villages Can Creatively Empower Communities to Assist Low-Income, Single Mothers In America," was recently published in the American University Journal of Gender Social Policy and Law.

References 

California State University, San Bernardino alumni
Harvard Law School faculty
1973 births
George Washington University Law School alumni
Harvard Kennedy School alumni
Living people
Public defenders
English expatriates in the United States
Expatriate academics in the United States
English people of Nigerian descent
English people of Sierra Leonean descent